The Raemelton Farm Historic District is a historic district in Mansfield, Ohio, United States.  Composed of thirteen contributing properties, it was listed on the National Register of Historic Places in 2003.  Among its buildings are examples of the Greek Revival and Colonial Revival styles of architecture, and it includes work by landscape architect Marian Cruger Coffin.

The center is a surviving part of a  estate owned by Frank Black, whose father had emigrated from Ramelton in County Donegal, Ireland.  The main barn was built in 1850 and remodeled in 1929; it was destroyed and rebuilt after fires in 1932 and 1937.

References

External links
Official site

National Register of Historic Places in Richland County, Ohio
Greek Revival architecture in Ohio
Colonial Revival architecture in Ohio
Historic districts on the National Register of Historic Places in Ohio
Farms on the National Register of Historic Places in Ohio